The 1887 New Zealand general election was held on 26 September to elect 95 MPs to the tenth session of the New Zealand Parliament. The Māori vote was held on 7 September.    175,410 votes (67.1% turnout) were cast. In 5 seats there was only one candidate.

1887 electoral redistribution
The Representation Act 1887 had major implication for the procedure of revising electoral boundaries. The revision task was transferred from committees formed by MPs to a permanent Representation Commission. The act specified that a country quota of 18% be applied to all designated districts that excluded boroughs with a population above 2,000 people, and that all electorates were to have the same nominal population within a tolerance of 750 people. It was also stipulated that electoral boundaries were to be reviewed after each New Zealand census.

In the 1887 electoral redistribution, although the Representation Commission was required through the Representation Act 1887 to maintain existing electorates "as far as possible", rapid population growth in the North Island required the transfer of three seats from the South Island to the north.
One former electorate, was recreated.

1887 was the year the Independent Representation Commission was established to redraw electorate boundaries after each five-yearly population census. The country quota was reduced to 18%. A £10 candidate's deposit was introduced.

The Scarecrow Ministry
The Stout-Vogel government had been soundly beaten. Only 34 returned members supported the government, whilst 52 opposition MPs were elected as well as nine independents. This led to much confusion in Wellington in September 1887 when the members gathered to form a government. John Bryce, William Rolleston and Robert Stout had all lost their seats. Sir John Hall said he was too old. Sir Julius Vogel's policies had been rejected by the voters.

So there was no alternative to Harry Atkinson, and after two weeks of negotiations he announced a ministry on 11 October. Only two ministers had served with him before. The Scarecrow Ministry was not expected to last, but did.

The years 1887 and 1888 were the worst of the Long Depression, and Atkinson cut salaries, raised loans and raised customs duties. He was not popular with the wealthy, but they feared the Opposition leaders Grey and Ballance even more. By 1890 Atkinson was too ill to make speeches in the House.

Results
The following table shows the results of the 1887 general election:

Notes

References